The Rio Grande Theatre in Las Cruces, New Mexico was opened on July 29, 1926. The theatre was built by Seale and Dyne and operated by the Central Theatres Corporation of Denver.

The first movie shown was the silent movie Mare Nostrum, directed by Rex Ingram.

The Rio Grande Theatre was bought by Fox West Coast Theatres in October 1929. The Fox chain installed sound equipment and showed a sound picture for the opening night, October 20, 1929.

The theatre survived both an earthquake and a fire in the early 1930s. It remained in operation until 1997, when it closed due to financial hardship. The theatre was purchased by the Dona Ana Arts Council and restored, opening again in 2005.

See also

National Register of Historic Places listings in Doña Ana County, New Mexico

References

External links

 Dona Ana Arts Council
 Opening of the Rio Grande Theatre
 Installing Sound Equipment in the Rio Grande Theatre

Buildings and structures in Las Cruces, New Mexico
Theatres in New Mexico
Buildings and structures in Doña Ana County, New Mexico
Tourist attractions in Doña Ana County, New Mexico